Bell Medal may refer to:

 IEEE Alexander Graham Bell Medal, awarded by the Institute of Electrical and Electronics Engineers
 Alexander Graham Bell Medal, awarded by the National Geographic Society
 Gertrude Bell Memorial Gold Medal, awarded by the British Institute for the Study of Iraq
 John Stewart Bell Prize, awarded by the Centre for Quantum Information and Quantum Control of the University of Toronto.